Poteat House, also known as Forest Home, is a historic plantation house located near Yanceyville, Caswell County, North Carolina.  It was built in 1855–1856, and consists of a two-story main block, three bays wide, with flanking one-story wings in the Greek Revival style. It has a center hall plan and was restored in 1928–1929 by Helen Poteat and her husband, author and playwright Laurence Stallings. It features a reconstructed double pedimented portico supported by four plain Roman Doric order columns.  Also on the property is a contributing small cabin used by enslaved people. The house was the birthplace of painter Ida Isabella Poteat.

It was added to the National Register of Historic Places in 1979.

References

Plantation houses in North Carolina
Houses on the National Register of Historic Places in North Carolina
Greek Revival houses in North Carolina
Houses completed in 1856
Houses in Caswell County, North Carolina
National Register of Historic Places in Caswell County, North Carolina
Slave cabins and quarters in the United States